Michaelophorus indentatus is a species of moth in the genus Michaelophorus known from Belize, Brazil, Mexico, and Panama.

References

Platyptiliini
Moths described in 1930
Moths of South America